Field of Glory or Fields of Glory may refer to:

Gaming

 Field of Glory, a series of computer games based on a 2008 miniature tabletop game
 Fields of Glory, a 1993 computer game
 Panzer Elite Action: Fields of Glory, a 2006 video game
 Fields of Glory, a 1996 wargame by Richard Berg
 Fields of Glory (Shatter), a strategy in Final Fantasy XIV: Heavensward

Literature 
On the Field of Glory, 1906 Polish novel
Field of Glory, 1990 French novel by Jean Rouaud
Fields of Glory, 2014 British novel by Michael Jecks
Fields of Glory: The Diary of Walter Tull, 2004 British novel by Walter Tull

Places
 "Field of Glory", site of the Battle of San Lorenzo in Argentina, 1803
 Sri Ksetra Kingdom ('Field of Glory'), in Myanmar